The 55th Academy of Country Music Awards were held in Nashville, Tennessee on September 16, 2020. Keith Urban was the host for the show. The event was originally planned to air on April 5 of the same year in Las Vegas, Nevada, but was postponed and relocated due to the COVID-19 pandemic.

The show was broadcast from the Grand Ole Opry House, Ryman Auditorium, and the Bluebird Café in Nashville, becoming the first major in-person award event to take place in the United States since the outbreak of the COVID-19 pandemic. With her Vocal Event win, Miranda Lambert won her 35th ACM award, extending her record as the most awarded person in ACM history. The ceremony also featured the first tie ever in ACM history for the highest honor of the evening, Entertainer of the Year, with both Thomas Rhett and Carrie Underwood claiming its title.

Winners and nominees 
Winners are shown in bold.

Performances

Presenters 
Presenters were announced September 14, 2020, two days before the ceremony.

References 

Academy of Country Music Awards
2020 music awards
Academy of Country Music Awards
Academy of Country Music Awards, 55
2020 in Tennessee
Academy of Country Music Awards, 55